is a Japanese professional basketball player for Utsunomiya Brex of the B.League. He was the first Japanese-born player to appear in a National Basketball Association (NBA) game.

Tabuse has enjoyed popularity in Japan since his high school playing days, when he led his school to three straight national championships, and has been referred to as "the Michael Jordan of Japan" for his celebrity status.

Career

Early years
Tabuse, who was born in Yokohama and grew up in what he calls "a sports family", began playing basketball at the age of nine, because he was not good at baseball and not interested in soccer. He attended Noshiro Technical High School in Akita Prefecture, where he led his team to national championships all three years he was there and lost only a single game.

After graduation from high school in March 1999, Tabuse chose to enroll at Brigham Young University-Hawaii for its English as an International Language program. He sat out his first two seasons at BYUH because of eligibility rules and played one season before turning pro. He averaged 7.6 points per game and led the Pacific West Conference with 6.6 assists.

Tabuse returned to join the Toyota Alvark, with whom he won the Japan Basketball League Rookie of the Year award for the 2002–03 season.

NBA
After leaving the Toyota Alvark in 2003, Tabuse became the first Japanese national to play in the NBA's summer league, playing six games in the Rocky Mountain Revue for the Dallas Mavericks, averaging 4.5 points, 1.7 rebounds and 1.0 assists in 13 minutes per game. Tabuse's first attempt at making it to the NBA made the headlines in Japan, and drew large media attention. On September 27 of that year, Tabuse joined the Denver Nuggets' training camp, but he was waived on October 24, before the start of the regular season.

Tabuse spent the 2003–04 season with the American Basketball Association champion Long Beach Jam, averaging 5.3 points, 2.4 rebounds, and a team-high 6.3 assists per game in 18 games.

In 2004, Tabuse joined the Phoenix Suns' training camp and made the opening night roster. He scored seven points in his first NBA game against the Atlanta Hawks on November 3, 2004, becoming on that day the first Japanese player ever to play in an NBA regular season game. However, he was waived by the Suns on December 16, 2004 after playing in four games and rejoined the Jam for the remainder of the season. Suns assistant coach Marc Iavaroni said of Tabuse: "I liked his energy, I liked his courage."

In 2005, Tabuse signed with the Los Angeles Clippers, but was waived before the start of the regular season. That fall, Tabuse appeared on a limited edition cover of NBA Live video game in Japan, even though he did not play a single NBA regular season game. That year, he was drafted by the Albuquerque Thunderbirds of the NBA Development League (D-League) and averaged 6.5 points and 4.0 assists in 34 games before he was waived on March 16, 2006. Michael Cooper, former NBA player and Tabuse's coach with the Albuquerque Thunderbirds, said of him, "He automatically changes the game because of his quickness and distributing the ball. He's the best fundamental player I've seen around in a long time."

In 2006, Tabuse decided to forsake an opportunity to play with the Japanese national team in the world championships that took place between August 19 to September 3 across five cities in Japan, and instead play with the Dallas Mavericks' summer league team. In November 2006, Tabuse was drafted into the NBA D-League with the 11th pick of the third round (35th overall) by the Bakersfield Jam.
In November 2007, Tabuse was cut by the Bakersfield Jam before the 2007–08 season.

On December 8, 2007, Tabuse was acquired by the Anaheim Arsenal of the D-League, and he made his debut on December 9 against the Bakersfield Jam, scoring 4 points and adding 3 assists in almost 13 minutes of play. For the 2007–08 season, Tabuse averaged 4.5 points, 1.2 rebounds and 2.0 assists in 39 games.

In July 2008, Tabuse joined the New Jersey Nets' squad in the Orlando Pro Summer League.

Return to Japan
In August 2008, Tabuse signed for Japan Basketball League side Link Tochigi Brex. Tochigi's head coach Mitsuhiko Kato was in charge of the basketball club of Noshiro Technical High School when Tabuse played for the school.

In April 2009, Tabuse was named to the 22-man roster for the Japan national basketball team. The team played at the FIBA Asia Championship for Men. In May 2009, ESPN reported that Tabuse would leave the national team after receiving an invitation by the Dallas Mavericks to compete in their summer camp.

In 2010, his team won the JBL Basketball League championship game. Tabuse was named Finals MVP. Tabuse's team would later win their second Japanese League championship in 2017 under the rebranded Japanese Professional Basketball League.

Career statistics

Regular season 

|-
| align="left" | 2004-05
| align="left" | Phoenix
| 4 || 0 || 4.3 || .167 || 1.00 || 1.00 || 1.0 || 0.8 || 0.0 || 0.0 ||  1.8
|-
|}

D-League 

|-
| align="left" | 2005-2006
| align="left" | ABQ
| 34 || 4 || 23.2 || .406 || .313 || .780 || 2.1 || 4.0 || 1.2 || 0.0 || 1.21 || 6.5
|-
| align="left" | 2006-2007
| align="left" | BAK
| 44 || 3 || 18.7 || .412 || .263 || .773 || 1.4 || 3.5 || 0.9 || 0.0 || 1.20 || 6.1
|-
| align="left" | 2007-2008
| align="left" | ANA
| 39 || 0 || 13.0 || .374 || .341 || .810 || 1.2 || 2.0 || 0.9 || 0.0 || 1.07 || 5.7
|}

JBL 

|-
| align="left" | 2008-2009
| align="left" | Tochigi
| 33 || 33 || 34.2 || .475 || .226 || .742 || 3.5 || 5.6 || 2.3 || 0.1 || 2.24 || 11.0
|-
| align="left" | 2009-2010
| align="left" | Tochigi
| 26 || -- || 26.6 || .551 || .360 || .803 || 3.1 || 3.5 || 2.0 || 0.0 || 1.46 || 11.8
|-
| align="left" | 2010-2011
| align="left" | Tochigi
| 31 || -- || 28.8 || .455 || .375 || .792 || 2.6 || 3.4 || 1.3 || 0.1 || 0.97 || 8.7
|-
| align="left" | 2011-2012
| align="left" | Tochigi
| 39|| || 20.9|| .488|| .156|| .741|| 2.3|| 2.6|| 1.2|| 0.1|| 1.5|| 6.4
|-
| align="left" | 2012-2013
| align="left" | Tochigi
| 22|| || 26.8|| .476|| .188|| .879|| 2.4|| 2.7|| 0.8|| 0.0|| 1.5|| 10.4
|}

NBL 

|-
| align="left" | 2013-2014
| align="left" | Tochigi
| 54 ||  || 32.8 || .441 || .330 || .858 || 4.2 || 5.9 || 2.0 || 0.1 || 2.1 || 15.6
|-
| align="left" | 2014-15
| align="left" | Tochigi
| 51|| || 26.9|| .471|| .250|| .814|| 2.2|| 4.5|| 1.7|| 0.1|| 1.7|| 10.3
|-
| align="left" | 2015-16
| align="left" | Tochigi
| 50|| || 23.7|| .484|| .310|| .826|| 2.0|| 3.3|| 1.2|| 0.0|| 1.0|| 7.0
|}

B.League

Regular season

|-
| align="left" | B1 2016-17
| align="left" | Tochigi
|59||59||20.8||49.7||27.8||83.9||1.8||3.4||1.0||0.1||0.9||7.4
|-
| align="left" | B1 2017-18
| align="left" | Tochigi
|60||60||17.9||47.7||13.6||86.2||1.7||2.7||0.8||0.0||0.8||5.4
|-
|}

See also
Basketball in Japan
Basketball in the United States
List of shortest players in National Basketball Association history

References

External links

Official site
NBA.com D-League profile
NBA.com player profile
NBA.com Yuta Tabuse Press Conference Transcript

1980 births
Living people
Albuquerque Thunderbirds players
Alvark Tokyo players
Anaheim Arsenal players
Bakersfield Jam players
Basketball players at the 2010 Asian Games
BYU–Hawaii Seasiders men's basketball players
Japanese men's basketball players
Utsunomiya Brex players
Long Beach Jam players
National Basketball Association players from Japan
Phoenix Suns players
Point guards
Sportspeople from Yokohama
Undrafted National Basketball Association players
Asian Games competitors for Japan